The Roman Catholic Diocese of Gbarnga is a diocese located in the city of Gbarnga in the Ecclesiastical province of Monrovia in Liberia.

History
 November 17, 1986: Established as Diocese of Gbarnga from the Metropolitan Archdiocese of Monrovia

Leadership
 Bishops of Gbarnga (Roman rite)
 Bishop Benedict Dotu Sekey (1986.11.17 – 2000.12.13)
 Bishop Lewis Jerome Zeigler (2002.05.30 — 2009.07.11), appointed Coadjutor Archbishop of Monrovia
 Bishop Anthony Fallah Borwah (since March 21, 2011)

See also
Catholic Church in Liberia

Sources
 GCatholic.org
 Catholic Hierarchy

Roman Catholic dioceses in Liberia
Christian organizations established in 1986
Roman Catholic dioceses and prelatures established in the 20th century
1986 establishments in Liberia
Roman Catholic